Ave María is a neighborhood belonging to the Carretera de Cádiz district of the Andalusian city of Málaga, Spain. According to the official delimitation of the city council, it limits to the northeast with the Tabacalera neighborhood; to the southeast, with the neighborhood of Pacífico; to the south, with the neighborhood of San Andrés; to the southwest, with the Parque Mediterráneo neighborhood; and to the northwest, with the neighborhoods of Las Delicias and Girón.

Transport 
By bus it is connected by the following EMT lines :

References 

Málaga
Neighbourhoods in Spain